The 1938 Connecticut gubernatorial election was held on November 8, 1938. Republican nominee Raymond E. Baldwin defeated Democratic incumbent Wilbur Lucius Cross with 36.43% of the vote.

General election

Candidates
Major party candidates
Raymond E. Baldwin, Republican
Wilbur Lucius Cross, Democratic

Other candidates
Jasper McLevy, Socialist
Joseph C. Borden Jr., Socialist Labor
Devere Allen, Independent

Results

References

1938
Connecticut
Gubernatorial